James "Sleeky" Reese was an American baseball pitcher in the Negro leagues. He played with the Cleveland Red Sox in 1934 and the Brooklyn Eagles in 1935.

References

External links
 and Seamheads

Cleveland Red Sox players
Brooklyn Eagles players
Year of birth missing
Year of death missing
Baseball pitchers